Crisia elegans is a species of bryozoans in the family Crisiidae. It was described from Cape of Good Hope in South Africa.

References

External links 

 Crisia elegans at WoRMS

Cyclostomatida
Animals described in 1821
Fauna of South Africa